The name Lester has been used for seven tropical cyclones in the Eastern Pacific Ocean.
 Tropical Storm Lester (1980)
 Tropical Storm Lester (1986)
 Hurricane Lester (1992)
 Hurricane Lester (1998)
 Tropical Storm Lester (2004)
 Hurricane Lester (2016)
 Tropical Storm Lester (2022)

Pacific hurricane set index articles